Catinca Tabacaru Gallery is a contemporary art gallery in New York City opened in May 2014. Catinca Tabacaru Gallery, Harare, the Gallery's second location was founded in August 2017 in partnership with Dzimbanhete Arts Interactions.

History
The gallery was founded by Catinca Tabacaru, a Romanian-born art dealer and curator, who worked as a litigation attorney and executive director of Women's Voices Now, in 2014 in the Lower East Side neighborhood of New York City. Tabacaru also co-founded and served as the executive director of Women's Voices Now, an organization that encourages women's filmmaking in Muslim-majority communities. In 2012, she stepped down from Women's Voices Now to focus primarily on her art career, and opened her first physical space for the Catinca Tabacaru Gallery in 2014. One year later she co-founded the CTG Collective, and subsequently CTG(R), a traveling art residency program affiliated with the gallery with its inaugural installment taking place in Zimbabwe. She curated her first institutional exhibition at the National Gallery of Zimbabwe in 2015. In 2020, the gallery exhibition space moved from NYC to Bucharest, Romania, Catinca’s home town.

Exhibitions

Solo exhibitions
 Gail Stoicheff: Little Miss Strange
 Yapci Ramos: Red-Hot
 Shinji Murakami: Lateral Thinking with Withered Technology
 Terrence Musekiwa: Standing on a line, not being on either side
 Joe Brittain: Past Tense
 Capucine Gros: Implicit Borders: a cartography of free will
 Mehryl Levisse: Birds of a feather fly together
 Admire Kamudzengerere: I am gonna...you. Till you run.
 Xavier Robles de Medina: if you dream of your tongue, beware
 Serra Victoria Bothwell Fels: a DEFECT // to DEFECT
 Greg Haberny: Py•r•o·glyph•s
 Justin Orvis Steimer: cave paintings of a homo galactian
 Sophia Wallace: OVER AND OVER AND OVER
 Radouan Zeghidour: HYPOGEA
 Jasmin Charles: Charly & Chill
 Shinji Murakami, Solo exhibition
 Greg Haberny: Domestic
 Justin Orvis Steimer: have you ever wondered what a soul looks like?
 Joe Brittain: Intercourse
 Gail Stoicheff: Distressed Blonde
 Rachel Monosov: Effects of Displacement
 Tamara Mendels: Flow
 Addam Yekutieli (aka Know Hope): EMPATHY
 Yapci Ramos: Perras y Putas

Group exhibitions
 1972: Rachel Monosov and Admire Kamudzengerere
 THE GUARDIAN AND THE BUILDER: Terrence Musekiwa, Justin Orvis Steimer
 TERRA NOVA: Rachel Monosov, Terrence Musekiwa, Yapci Ramos, Justin Orvis Steimer
 FRAGMENTED TIME: Ella Littwiz, Rachel Monosov, Benjamin Verhoeven, Reijiro Wada
 Zig Zag Zim Part II: Admire Kamudzengerere, Rachel Monosov, Terrence Musekiwa, Xavier Robles de Medina and Justin Orvis Steimer
 Zig Zag Zim Part I: Virginia Chihota, Admire Kamudzengerere, Rachel Monosov, Terrence Musekiwa and Justin Orvis Steimer
 Devotion: Mike Ballou, Joe Brittain, William Corwin, Serra Victoria Bothwell Fels, Elizabeth Ferry, Rico Gatson, Elisabeth Kley, Rachel Monosov, Roxy Paine, Joyce Pensato, Katie Bond Pretti, Carin Riley, Paul Anthony Smith, Justin Orvis Steimer, Gail Stoicheff, and Sophia Wallace.
 Material Myth: Tracey Emin, Caroline Wells Chandler, Meg Lipke, Rachael Gorchov, Roxanne Jackson and Robin Kang
 Fictions and Constructions: Rui Chafes, Felix R. Cid, and Xavier Robles de Medina
 Robin Kang & Duhirwe Rushemeza: Danger is in the Neatness of Identification
 Make it Big, Make it Red, Put a Crown on It:  Doo-Jin Ahn, Jasmin Charles, Christian Dore, Barnaby Furnas, Peter Kappa, Brian Leo, Greg Haberny & Andrew Smenos
 It Begins on Paper: Patricia Cronin, Greg Haberny, Rachel Monosov, Xavier Robles de Medina, Justin Orvis Steimer, Gail Stoicheff & Sophia Wallace

References

External links
 

2014 establishments in New York City
Art museums and galleries in New York City